Second Chances is a 2015 Philippine television drama romantic series broadcast by GMA Network. It premiered on the network's Telebabad line up from January 12, 2015 to May 8, 2015, replacing Hiram na Alaala.

Mega Manila ratings are provided by AGB Nielsen Philippines.

Series overview

Episodes

January 2015

February 2015

March 2015

April 2015

May 2015

References

Lists of Philippine drama television series episodes